Caladenia speciosa, commonly known as the sandplain white spider orchid, is a species of orchid endemic to the south-west of Western Australia. It has a single erect, hairy leaf and up to three relatively large white flowers tinged with pink and with a fringe of long teeth on the sides of the labellum.

Description 
The flowers are white, often with a pink or red tinge. The sepals and petals have long, thin, brownish thread-like tips. The tip of the labellum is curled under and there are between four and six rows of pink or white calli along the mid-line of the labellum. Flowering occurs from September to October but is more prolific after fire the previous summer.

Taxonomy and naming 
Caladenia speciosa was first formally described in 2001 by Stephen Hopper and Andrew Phillip Brown from a specimen collected near Bunbury and the description was published in Nuytsia. The specific epithet (speciosa) is a Latin word meaning "beautiful", "handsome", "splendid" or "showy" referring to the "large, attractive flowers" of this orchid.

Distribution and habitat 
The sandplain white spider orchid is found between Mundijong and Boyanup in the Jarrah Forest and Swan Coastal Plain biogeographic regions where it grows in woodland.

Conservation
Caladenia speciosa is classified as "Priority Four" by the Government of Western Australia Department of Parks and Wildlife, meaning that is rare or near threatened.

References

speciosa
Endemic orchids of Australia
Orchids of Western Australia
Plants described in 2001
Endemic flora of Western Australia
Taxa named by Stephen Hopper
Taxa named by Andrew Phillip Brown